The Crown and Anchor is a Grade II listed public house at 137 Drummond Street, Euston, London NW1 2HL.

It was built in the 19th century.

References

Grade II listed pubs in London
19th-century architecture in the United Kingdom
Buildings and structures completed in the 19th century
Buildings and structures in the London Borough of Camden